Atka is a small city located on the east side of Atka Island, in Aleutians West Census Area, Alaska, United States.  The population was 53 at the 2020 census, down from 61 in 2010.

The population of Atka is nearly entirely Aleut (Unangan). The major industry is fishing.

Geography
Atka is located at  (52.199271, -174.213398).

Atka is formed by a shield volcano, with a number of outlets. The highest point on Atka is Korovin Volcano, which last erupted in 2006.

Demographics

Atka first appeared on the 1880 U.S. Census as the unincorporated Aleut village of "Nazan". It had 236 residents, of which 220 were Aleut, 14 were Creole (Mixed Russian & Native) and 2 were White. In 1890, it returned as Atka, with 132 residents, of which 116 were native, 15 were Creole and 1 White. It did not appear again under the name "Atka" on the census until 1920, and in every successive census. It was made a census-designated place (CDP) in 1980 and formally incorporated in 1988.

As of the census of 2000, there were 92 people, 32 households, and 20 families residing in the hamlet. The population density was 10.5 people per square mile (4.1/km2). There were 41 housing units at an average density of 4.7 per square mile (1.8/km2). The racial makeup of the city was 80.43% Native American, 6.52% White, 1.09% Asian, 1.09% Pacific Islander, and 10.87% from two or more races. 1.09% of the population were Hispanic or Latino of any race.

Of the 32 households, 40.6% had children under the age of 18 living with them, 37.5% were married couples living together, 9.4% had a female householder with no husband present, and 34.4% were non-families. 28.1% of all households were made up of individuals, and 9.4% had someone living alone who was 65 years of age or older. The average household size was 2.69 and the average family size was 3.33.

In the city the population was spread out, with 30.4% under the age of 18, 7.6% from 18 to 24, 29.3% from 25 to 44, 23.9% from 45 to 64, and 8.7% who were 65 years of age or older. The median age was 36 years. For every 100 females, there were 100.0 males. For every 100 females age 18 and over, there were 106.5 males.

The median income for a household in the hamlet was $30,938, and the median income for a family was $34,375. Males had a median income of $28,750 versus $33,438 for females. The per capita income for the city was $17,080. There were no families and 7.5% of the population living below the poverty line, including no under eighteens and 26.7% of those over 64.

Atka Airport is the island's only airstrip.

Education
Atka is served by the Aleutian Region Schools. The Yakov E. Netsvetov School serves grades K-12. The school has two teachers, one for the elementary grades and one for the secondary grades. In the 2019-20 school year, it had 10 enrolled students.

See also

Atka Airport

References

External links
 Atka at the Community Database Online from the Alaska Division of Community and Regional Affairs
 Maps from the Alaska Department of Labor and Workforce Development: 2000, 2010

Cities in Alaska
Cities in Aleutians West Census Area, Alaska
Populated coastal places in Alaska on the Pacific Ocean
Road-inaccessible communities of Alaska